Theodoor Hendrik Nikolaas de Booy (December 5, 1882 – February 18, 1919) was a Dutch-born American archaeologist.

Biography
De Booy was born as son of a vice admiral in Hellevoetsluis, Netherlands. He was educated at the Royal Naval Institute. At the age of 23, he migrated to the United States where he married Elizabeth Hamilton Smith on March 29, 1909.They had two children.

In 1916 he became an American citizen. In 1911 he went to the Bahamas with his wife. During their archaeological fieldwork in the caves and middens they made remarkable discoveries (e.g. a paddle or pottery) from the Pre-Columbian culture of the Lucayan. In the following years he worked for the Heye Museum in New York City. His fieldwork in the Caribbean and in Venezuela made him a prolific expert for the history of the Pre-Columbian Arawak culture.

He died from influenza in his home in Yonkers, New York on February 18, 1919.

Alexander Wetmore named the extinct Antillean cave rail (Nesotrochis debooyi) after de Booy.

Selected works
1913: Lucayan Artifacts from the Bahamas
1915: Pottery from Certain Caves in Eastern Santo Domingo, West Indies
1915: Certain West-Indian Superstitions Pertaining to Celts
1916: Notes on the Archaeology of Margarita Island, Venezuela
1918: Certain Archaeological Investigations in Trinidad, British West Indies
1918: The Virgin Islands Our New Possessions and the British Islands
1919: Indian Notes and Monographs Volume 1, No. 2: Santo Domingo Kitchen-Midden and Burial Ground1920: Indian Notes and Monographs Vol. X, No. 3: An Illinois Quilled Necklace
1926: Onder de Motilone's van de Sierre de Perija (Venezuela)

References

External links

1882 births
1919 deaths
People from Yonkers, New York
Dutch emigrants to the United States
People from Hellevoetsluis
20th-century American archaeologists
20th-century American anthropologists
Historians from New York (state)
Deaths from Spanish flu